Neville Alfred Huxford (27 October 1937 – 21 November 2006) was a cricketer who played first-class cricket for Wellington and Canterbury in New Zealand from 1965 to 1970.

Huxford was a consistent pace bowler throughout his career, but he never excelled the figures he achieved in his first two matches. On his first-class debut in January 1965 he took 7 for 95 in the first innings for Wellington against the touring Pakistan team. In his next match a week later, his first in the Plunket Shield, he took 6 for 38 in the first innings against Auckland.

References

External links
 
 

1937 births
2006 deaths
New Zealand cricketers
Canterbury cricketers
Wellington cricketers
Cricketers from Wellington City